Noor Muhammad Lashari ([Sindhi: نور محمد لاشاري], 24 October 1931- 1 February 1997) was a stage, radio, TV and film actor from Sindh, Pakistan. He was awarded the Pride of Performance Award in 1992 by the Government of Pakistan.

Early life 
Noor Muhammad Lashari was born on 24 October 1931 at Village Kot Lashari, near Bhan Saeedabad, Jamshoro District, Sindh, Pakistan. He was the only son of his parents. His father's name was Faiz Muhammad Lashari. After completing school education, he began his career as a primary school teacher.

Acting career 
He began his career as an artist by acting in local stage drama. He joined the local stage drama Society called Ustad Bukhari Natak Mandil (Ustad Bukhari Drama Society) and performed various roles in many plays staged by this drama society. He joined Radio Pakistan Hyderabad in 1960, first as a Copyist and then as a drama artist. After a considerably successful career at Radio Pakistan Hyderabad, he moved to Karachi in 1967 and started acting in TV plays and serials. He played memorable roles in many Sindhi and Urdu language plays/serials telecast by Pakistan Television Centre Karachi. Dungi Manjh Darya (Sindhi: دنگي منجھ درياءٌ), Miteea Ja Manhu (Sindhi:مٽيءَ جا ماڻھو) and Rani Ji Kahani         (Sindhi: راڻيءَ جي ڪھاڻي) are among his hundreds of Sindhi language Pakistan Television (ptv) plays/serials

He also performed supporting roles in many Sindhi films and one Balochi film.

Urdu TV plays/serials, 
Noor Muhammad Lashari performed in numerous TV plays/serials. Some of the popular Urdu language serials in which he acted are  listed below.  
 Badaltay Mausam (Urdu: .بدلتے موسم)
 Chand Girhan (Urdu: چاند گرہن) 
 Chhoti Si Dunya (Urdu: چھوٹی سی دنیا )
 Dasht (Urdu: دشت)
 Deewaren (Urdu: دیواریں)
 Jungle (Urdu: جنگل)
 Khan Sahib (Urdu: خانصاحب)
 Marvi (Urdu: ماروی)

Sindhi Films 

 Barsaat Ji Raat (Sindhi: برسات جي رات)  
 Bewas (Sindhi: بيوس)  
 Ghatu Ghar Na Aaya (Sindhi: گھاتو گھر نہ آيا)
 Mithra Shaal Milan (Sindhi: مٺڙا شال ملن)
 Muhinjo Piyar Pukaray (Sindhi: منھنجو پيار پڪاري)
 Paru (Sindhi: پارو)
 Rat Ain Ajrak (Sindhi: رت ۽ اجرڪ)  
 Shaheed (Sindhi: شھيد)

Balochi film 

 Hamal o Mah Gaj

Honours and awards 

 Pride of Performance Award (1992),
 The First Indus Drama Award (1995)
 He also won a number of Pakistan Television Awards

Death 
Noor Muhammad Lashari was a diabetes patient and passed away on 1 February 1997 in Karachi and was buried in Manghopir Graveyard, Karachi, Sindh, Pakistan.

References 

1997 deaths
1931 births
Pakistani male television actors
Recipients of the Pride of Performance
Sindhi people